Milan Trajković (born 17 March 1992 in Surdulica) is a Serbian-born Cypriot athlete specialising in the sprint hurdles. He has won two gold medals at the Games of the Small States of Europe.

Biography
Trajković was raised in the Serbian town of Surdulica but emigrated with his family to Cyprus at the age of nine with the end of SFR of Yugoslavia as a result of the NATO bombing of Yugoslavia.

At the 2016 Rio Olympics, he qualified for the final of Men's 110 metres hurdles with times of 13.41 seconds and 13.31 in the semi-finals. With this qualification, Trajkovic became the first Cypriot athlete to qualify for this event at the Olympic Games.

His personal bests are 13.25 seconds in the 110 metres hurdles (0.0 m/s, London 2017) and 7.51 seconds in the 60 metres hurdles (Birmingham, 2018). Both are current national records.

Competition record

1Disqualified in the final

References

1992 births
Living people
People from Surdulica
Naturalized citizens of Cyprus
Cypriot people of Serbian descent
Cypriot male hurdlers
Athletes (track and field) at the 2014 Commonwealth Games
Athletes (track and field) at the 2018 Commonwealth Games
Commonwealth Games competitors for Cyprus
Athletes (track and field) at the 2016 Summer Olympics
Olympic athletes of Cyprus
Serb diaspora sportspeople
Yugoslav Wars refugees
World Athletics Championships athletes for Cyprus
European Athletics Indoor Championships winners
Athletes (track and field) at the 2020 Summer Olympics
Mediterranean Games gold medalists in athletics
Athletes (track and field) at the 2022 Mediterranean Games
Mediterranean Games gold medalists for Cyprus